Qaim Bharwana is a town of the Tehsil Shorkot Jhang district in the Punjab province of Pakistan. This village has a Govt High school for girls and boys each,Iqra Model School, a library which has been rebuilt recently. Qaim Bharwana also has a family planning center, Rural Dispensary and a functional civil Veterinary dispensary (Animal Hospital).

Populated places in Jhang District
Jhang District